The University of Cambridge Department of Engineering is the largest department at the University of Cambridge and one of the leading centres of engineering in the world. The department's aim is to address the world's most pressing challenges with science and technology. To achieve this aim, the department collaborates with other disciplines, institutions, companies and entrepreneurs and adopts an integrated approach to research and teaching.

The main site is situated at Trumpington Street, to the south of the city centre of Cambridge. The department is the primary centre for engineering teaching and research activities in Cambridge. The department is currently headed by Richard Prager.

History
In 1782, the Reverend Richard Jackson of Torrington, former fellow of Trinity College, died leaving a substantial portion of his estate to endow a Professorship of Natural Experimental Philosophy. This became forerunner to the Professorship of Mechanism and Applied Mechanics, first held in 1875 by James Stuart.

The first engineering workshop at Cambridge was constructed in 1878, a wooden hut fifty by twenty feet. The department now boasts several sites around Cambridge:

 The main buildings are located at Trumpington Street and Fen Causeway on the Scroope House site, where most of the undergraduate teaching in the Engineering Tripos is carried out. The Baker Building was opened by the Duke of Edinburgh, Prince Philip, on the 13th November 1952.
 Various sections which could not easily be accommodated on the main site have moved to the university's West Cambridge site, including the Whittle Laboratory (a turbomachinery laboratory, founded by Sir John Horlock, in 1973), The Geotechnical Centrifuge laboratory, the Microelectronics Research Centre (1992), the Electrical Engineering Division building and the Institute for Manufacturing (IfM). 
 A few of the smaller buildings on the Old Addenbrooke's Site, in Trumpington Street opposite the Scroope House Site, have been used by the department from time to time.  Currently, the Cambridge Programme for Sustainability Leadership is in the end building of that site, 1 Trumpington Street, having expanded and moved there under its previous name of Cambridge Programme for Industry in 1991.
 In 2016, the construction of The James Dyson Building was completed in front of the Baker Building - providing additional office space, and seminar/meeting rooms for use by the department.
 Over the course of the next 10 years, the department plans to consolidate the Department of Engineering entirely on the west Cambridge site.

Notable companies and projects founded by students and alumni 
Cambridge University Eco Racing, a student run team which designs builds and races solar electric vehicles.
Innocent Drinks, best known for the Innocent Smoothie brand.
Cambridge Consultants, an international technology development and consultancy company.
Cambridge Scientific Instrument Company, first manufacturer of the scanning electron microscope.

Undergraduate education
There are about 1,200 undergraduate students in the department at any time, with about 320 students admitted each year.

The first two years are essentially the same for all students and aim to give a broad overview, covering mechanical and structural engineering, as well as materials, electrical and information engineering. From the third year, students are required to specialise, undertaking either the Engineering Tripos or Manufacturing Engineering Tripos.

In the Engineering Tripos, students may specialise in one or more of nine engineering disciplines:

Aerospace and aerothermal engineering
Bioengineering
Civil, structural and environmental engineering
Electrical and electronic engineering
Electrical and information sciences
Energy, sustainability and the environment
Information and computer engineering
Instrumentation and control
Mechanical engineering

It is also possible to not specialise and receive a degree in General Engineering.

Meanwhile, the Manufacturing Engineering Tripos provides an integrated course in industrial engineering, including both operations and management.

Graduate education

The Department of Engineering currently has about 190 faculty and PI-status researchers, 300 postdoctoral researchers, and 850 graduate students. Post-graduate education in the consists of both taught courses and research degrees (PhD, MPhil and MRes). The majority of research students study for a PhD degree while around 10 per cent follow the one-year MPhil (research) programme.

The department also has a number of Engineering and Physical Sciences Research Council (EPSRC) Centres for Doctoral Training (CDTs), which follow a 1-plus-3 year model where a one-year MRes course is followed by a three-year PhD. Full funding for four years is provided through these centres. In addition to the CDTs, the department has a limited number of EPSRC PhD studentships available for British and EU students.

Research Evaluation 

The department was ranked 2nd among UK engineering departments in 2021 Research Excellence Framework (REF). It also ranked 2nd in 2014.

Notable alumni and researchers 

Fellows of the Royal Society

 William Dalby
 Alfred Ewing
 Bertram Hopkinson
 Sir Charles Edward Inglis
 John Baker
 John Horlock
 Brian Spalding
 Robert Mair
 Michael Gaster
 Daniel Wolpert
 John Arthur Shercliff
 John Denton
 Alistair MacFarlane
 Christopher Calladine
 Richard V. Southwell
 Frank Whittle
 Sir Christopher Sydney Cockerell
 Sir Bennett Melvill Jones
 Charles Oatley
 Harry Ricardo
 Andrew Schofield
 Ann Dowling
 Zoubin Ghahramani
 Keith Glover
 Melvill Jones
 John Robertson
 Mark Welland
 Roberto Cipolla
 Stephen Young
 Gareth McKinley
 William Hawthorne
 Alec Broers
 Kenneth Bray
 Andrew Clennel Palmer
 Morien Morgan
 Christopher Hinton
 David J. C. MacKay
 Michael F. Ashby
 Kenneth L. Johnson
 Norman Fleck
 Vikram Deshpande 

 Members of the Order of Merit
 Frank Whittle
 Christopher Hinton
 Ann Dowling

Timoshenko Medal Recipients
 Richard V. Southwell
 Kenneth L. Johnson
 James N. Goodier

Notable people for their contributions

 John Baker, developer of the plasticity theory of design.
 Brian Spalding, a founder of computational fluid mechanics.
 Sir Christopher Sydney Cockerell, English engineer, best known as the inventor of the hovercraft.
 Sir Charles Edward Inglis, under whose leadership the department became the largest in the university.
 Sir Bennett Melvill Jones, who demonstrated the importance in streamlining in aircraft design.
 Ian Liddell, designer of the Millennium Dome.
 Charles Oatley, developer of one of the first commercial scanning electron microscopes.
 Nicholas Patrick, astronaut.
 W. E. W. Petter, aeronautical engineer, designer of Westland Lysander, English Electric Canberra and the Folland Gnat
 Harry Ricardo, major contributor to development of the internal combustion engine.
 Andrew Schofield, pioneer in centrifuge research.
 James Stuart, first true professor of engineering at Cambridge appointed in 1875.
 Constance Tipper, metallurgist, crystallographer and first woman to serve full-time as faculty in the department.
 Carol Vorderman, former Countdown host and mathematical television personality.
 Frank Whittle, inventor of the jet engine.
 Reverend Robert Willis, the first Cambridge professor to win an international reputation as a mechanical engineer.
 James N. Goodier, co-author of "Theory of Elasticity" with Stephen Timoshenko.
 Morien Morgan, sometimes referred to as "the Father of Concorde".
 Christopher Hinton, supervised construction of Calder Hall, the world's first large-scale commercial nuclear power station.
 James A. Greenwood, winner of Tribology Gold Medal, known for the Greenwood and Williamson model of contact interfaces.
 Bertram Hopkinson, who proposed the Split-Hopkinson pressure bar method to measure dynamic stress–strain response of materials.

See also
 Engineering
 Glossary of engineering
 Department of Engineering Science, University of Oxford

References

1875 establishments in England
Educational institutions established in 1875
Engineering, Department of
Engineering, Department of
Cambridge